Compliance is a 2012 American thriller film written and directed by Craig Zobel and starring Ann Dowd, Dreama Walker, Pat Healy, and Bill Camp. The plot of the movie is closely based upon an actual strip search phone call scam that took place in Mount Washington, Kentucky in 2004. In both the film and the real-life incident, a caller posing as a police officer convinced a restaurant manager and others to carry out unlawful and intrusive procedures on an innocent employee.

Compliance had its world premiere at the Sundance Film Festival on January 21, 2012 and was distributed by Magnolia Pictures for its general release on August 17, 2012. Dowd's performance as Sandra, the manager, won the National Board of Review Award for Best Supporting Actress.

Plot
Sandra, manager of a ChickWich fast food restaurant, receives a call from someone identifying himself as Officer Daniels. He claims to be in contact with the regional manager about a customer who had money allegedly stolen by an employee that day. Daniels says that he will remain on the phone while Sandra detains the employee until the police arrive. Sandra identifies Becky as the suspect based on the description; Daniels confirms the name.

Sandra brings Becky to the restaurant office. Becky denies the theft. At Daniels' behest, Sandra searches Becky's pockets and purse and finds nothing. Telling her that the alternative is to have Becky go to jail, Daniels has her strip-search Becky in the presence of another employee, Marti. Daniels tells Sandra that he and other officers are searching Becky's home on suspicion that her brother is involved in drugs, and that Becky may be involved. He has Sandra put Becky's clothes into a bag and take it to her car for inspection by the police.

Sandra insists she resume managing the restaurant as it is busy. After Daniels stipulates that a male employee watch Becky for "security reasons", another employee, Kevin, is brought in, but questions Daniels' instructions and leaves. Sandra's fiancé Van takes over; under pressure from Daniels over the beers he drank before driving to the restaurant, he has Becky perform nude jumping jacks, ostensibly to shake loose any contraband concealed in her body. After Becky protests, Daniels has Van spank her. Eventually, Becky is coerced into performing oral sex on Van. Van leaves with guilt and is replaced by the custodian, Harold, who is outraged by Daniels' instructions. Harold tells Sandra about Daniels' orders; she calls the regional manager, who tells her he has no idea about any investigation.

The police discover that a similar incident happened elsewhere. Daniels is identified by closed circuit recordings and arrested; he is a family man working as a telemarketer. Becky meets an attorney to discuss options for suing Sandra. Sandra, now unemployed and no longer seeing Van, tells a journalist she is a blameless victim.

Cast

 Ann Dowd as Sandra Frum
 Dreama Walker as Becky
 Pat Healy as The Caller ("Officer Daniels")
 Bill Camp as Van
 Philip Ettinger as Kevin
 James McCaffrey as Detective Neals
 Ashlie Atkinson as Marti
 Stephen Payne as Harold

Release
Compliance premiered at the 2012 Sundance Film Festival in January. The film received a limited release in the United States beginning August 17, 2012. It was released by Soda Pictures in the UK and Ireland on March 22, 2013.

Reception
The film received generally positive reviews and Dowd's performance as the manipulated restaurant manager was met with critical acclaim, earning her the National Board of Review Award for Best Supporting Actress. The review aggregator website Rotten Tomatoes reports an 89% approval rating with an average rating of 7.5/10 based on 140 reviews. The website's consensus reads, "Anchored by smart, sensitive direction and strong performances, Compliance is a ripped-from-the-headlines thriller that's equal parts gripping and disturbing." On Metacritic, it has a score of 68 out of 100 based on 32 reviews, indicating "generally favorable reviews".

At the premiere at the 2012 Sundance Film Festival, Compliance was met with controversy, as the audience's response included several walkouts and shouting matches during the film's question and answer session.

See also
 Compliance (psychology)
 Strip search phone call scam
 Stanford prison experiment

References

External links
 
 
 
 
 
 Compliance, on iTunes, movie trailers

2012 films
2012 thriller films
American thriller films
Thriller films based on actual events
American independent films
Law enforcement in fiction
Prank calling
Sexual abuse
Films about telephony
Films directed by Craig Zobel
Films about fraud
Films set in restaurants
2012 independent films
Strip search
2010s English-language films
2010s American films